Pádraig Brennan (born 25 December 1978) is an Irish former Gaelic football selector and retired player. His league and championship career with the Kildare senior team spanned nine seasons from 1997 until 2006.

Honours

 Sarsfields
 Kildare Senior Football Championship (4): 1999, 2001, 2005, 2012

 Kildare
 Leinster Senior Football Championship (2): 1998, 2000

References

1978 births
Living people
Sarsfields (Kildare) Gaelic footballers
Kildare inter-county Gaelic footballers
Gaelic football selectors